Qusayr may refer to:

Al-Qusayr, Egypt
Al-Qusayr District, Syria
Al-Qusayr, Syria, a city
Qusayr, Yemen
Koz Castle, Turkey, also known as Qusayr

See also
Battle of al-Qusayr (2012)
Al-Qusayr offensive
Battle of al-Qusayr (2013)